Sportclub Veendam was a Dutch professional association football club based in Veendam, province of Groningen. Founded on 4 September 1894 as Look-Out, it became P.J. Veendam in 1909, Veendam in 1910, SC Veendam in 1974, BV Veendam in 1997 and again SC Veendam in 2011. The club was a founder member of the regional first tier Eerste Klasse Noord in 1916 and became champions of the division in 1931–32; it qualified for the national championship play-offs but finished in bottom place. Veendam took part in the inaugural season of the third tier Tweede Divisie in 1956–57; after yo-yoing between the third and second tiers, the team won promotion to the first tier Eredivisie for the first time in 1985–86. The side spent two seasons in the Eredivisie—1986–87 and 1988–89—but were relegated both times. Veendam then competed in the second tier Eerste Divisie until they were dissolved due to financial problems in 2013.

The team's stadion was De Langeleegte, where they had played since their foundation. Although Veendam is a small town with around 20,000 inhabitants, the club recorded average attendances of around 3,500. Veendam's home kit colours were black and yellow. The club was nicknamed "Veenkolonialen" (English: "Peat colonials"), reflecting the area’s peat history.

History

1894–1960 
The club was founded on 4 September 1894 as Look-Out by Be Quick 1887 youth player Bruins Oving, who was lodging in Veendam, Carel Herman Steenhuisen and other young players from Veendam. Their first pitch was opposite coaching inn ’t Vosje at De Langeleegte. In 1905, the club and another Veendam-based team, Vitesse, merged; the name Look-Out was retained. After Princess Juliana was born in 1909, Look-Out was changed to P.J. Veendam, although the club removed the abbreviation “P.J.” the following year. Veendam were one of the founder members of the regional first tier Eerste Klasse Noord in 1916 but finished bottom of the league of seven teams in their inaugural season. In 1919, Veendam merged with Jupiter, a club from a working-class background; the name Veendam was retained. After several mid-table finishes, the team finished runners-up in 1929–30 and 1930–31, before winning their first and only Eerste Klasse Noord title in 1931–32. Veendam qualified for the national championship play-offs. The side played Ajax, Feijenoord, SC Enschede and PSV; they won one game (away at PSV), lost seven matches and were ranked in bottom place.

As a result of the successful spell, Veendam winger Jaap Woltjes was called up for the Dutch national team for a friendly against English side Nottingham Forest in 1936; Woltjes came on as a substitute in a 1–0 defeat. Although Veendam recorded a second place finish in the 1935–36 Eerste Klasse Noord, the team began to slide down the league table; they were eventually relegated to the Tweede Klasse in 1947–48. In 1950, the club signed its first manager, . Veendam returned to the Eerste Klasse in 1954. During the same year, the club turned professional. The Veendam players earned 15 guilders per win (the equivalent of € as of ), 10 per draw and 5 per loss; the players also received 5 guilders per week if they took part in 3 training sessions. In 1956, the first tier Eredivisie, the second tier Eerste Divisie and the third tier Tweede Divisie were established; Veendam were founder members of the Tweede Divisie and placed fourth during the initial season. The side were promoted to the Eerste Divisie as runners-up in 1958–59.

1960–1990 

In 1961, the club reorganized its structure as it established three boards: for the professional department, the amateurs and the youth. During this period, several Veendam players received employment at the local DWM potato starch factory. Veendam were relegated to the Tweede Divisie in 1964–65 but won promoted back to the second tier in 1967–68. The club appointed 26-year-old Leo Beenhakker as manager in 1968; he remained in post until 1972 and later managed Ajax and Real Madrid. In 1974, the club’s professional and amateur departments split; the professional side continued under the name SC Veendam. During the 1977–78 KNVB Cup, the team defeated Feyenoord 2–1 in the third round and reached the quarter-finals, in which Veendam were eliminated 4–2 on aggregate by Excelsior. Two Dutch international strikers made their professional debuts with Veendam during this period: Dick Nanninga in 1973 and Jurrie Koolhof in 1978.

Veendam came close to bankruptcy in 1984 but a deficit of 2,5 million guilders (the equivalent of € as of ) was eliminated. During the same year, former Veendam player Henk Nienhuis became the club’s manager. Under his tenure, Veendam won promotion to the Eredivisie for the first time in 1985–86. The team finished the season in fourth place and qualified for the promotion play-offs; Veendam were victorious in all six matches and won promotion to the top flight. Around 12,500 spectators were in attendance at De Langeleegte in the decisive game against Willem II (1–0 win, goal from ). Nienhuis’ squad was mostly composed of former FC Groningen players, such as Joop Gall, Pieter Huistra and Harris Huizingh. Veendam finished 17th out of 18 sides in 1986–87 and were relegated back to the second tier. The team ranked second and won promotion to the Eredivisie in 1987–88; Veendam finished in bottom place and were again relegated after one season in the Eredivisie.

1990–2013 
In the 1995–96 Eerste Divisie, the team qualified for the promotion play-offs but finished second in the group behind NEC Nijmegen and remained in the second tier. In 1997, Sportclub Veendam changed its name to BV Veendam (BV stands for “Betaald Voetbal”; English: “Professional Football”). The club was plaged by financial problems during the following years; in 2003, it sold De Langeleegte to the municipality of Veendam for a fee of €3.2 million. Nevertheless, Veendam qualified for the 2006–07 Eerste Divisie promotion play-offs but were eliminated by Excelsior in the second round. The team reached the Eerste Divisie promotion play-offs again in 2010–11 but were eliminated in the second round by Helmond Sport.

In 2010, Veendam was declared bankrupt but it was later annulled on appeal. The following year, in order to attract more investors, the club was renamed SC Veendam, adopted a new badge which included a peat wheelbarrow, and a yellow shirt with a black V. The financial problems remained, however, and Veendam played their last ever match on 15 March 2013—a 2–1 win against FC Oss—and were declared bankrupt on 25 March. The club was dissolved on 2 April, with debts of around €1 million.

According to a reconstruction made by RTV Noord and Dagblad van het Noorden in August 2013, the death of catering entrepreneur and Veendam supporter Jan Lambeck in 2009 meant the end of an important income source, which eventually led to the bankruptcy of the club.

Crest and colours 
Veendam had several badges throughout their history. From 1997 to 2011, when the club played under the name BV Veendam, its black and yellow crest featured a football and the words "De Langeleegte". In 2011, the club adopted a new logo, which was chosen by around 2,500 fans, designers of Groningen-based La Compagnie and members of Veendam’s businessclub. The badge, designed by La Compagnie’s Herman ter Reegen, featured a yellow shield with a black V and a peat wheelbarrow, reflecting the area’s peat history.

The club’s first kit was a blue shirt with a red sash, white shorts and a blue calotte which included the name “Look-Out”. In 1919, when Veendam merged with Jupiter, the kit changed to a yellow shirt and black shorts. The club retained the yellow and black colours until its dissolvement in 2013.

Stadium 

Veendam’s first pitch was opposite coaching inn ’t Vosje at De Langeleegte. In 1945, the club’s first team moved to the pitch at De Langeleegte’s swimming pool. In 1954, De Langeleegte stadium was built and opened by minister Sicco Mansholt. The first floodlights were installed in 1960, and De Langeleegte became one of the first Dutch stadiums to have underseat heating. The ground was redeveloped in 1998 and its capacity was reduced to a 6,500 all-seater. As the club was plaged by financial problems during the following years, it sold De Langeleegte to the municipality of Veendam in 2003. 

In 2008, Veendam expressed an interest in building a new stadium away from De Langeleegte. Designed by Klaas Paul de Boer, the new ground would hold 15,000 people; due to its unusual design, with curves on the sides of the grandstand, it was quickly dubbed “Bananenstadion” (English: “Banana stadium”) by locals. The plans later stalled and De Langeleegte remained Veendam’s home.

Supporters and rivalries 
Veendam is a small town in eastern Groningen with approximately 20,000 inhabitants. The club recorded average attendances of around 3,500 during the last seasons; at games against local rivals, this figure often rose to 5,500.

Groningen held the better head-to-head record, as they won 13 games to Veendam's 5. The sides met four times in the Eredivisie—in 1986–87 and 1988–89, with both teams winning once. Veendam’s other rivals were FC Emmen from the province of Drenthe; Veendam won 19 matches, while Emmen were victorious in 17 games.

Honours
Eerste Divisie (Tier 2)
 Promotion: 1985–86, 1987–88
Tweede Divisie (Tier 3)
 Promotion: 1958–59, 1967–68
Eerste Klasse Noord
 Champions: 1931–32
Source:

Records and statistics
The record for the most first team appearances in all competitions for Veendam was held by defender Max Rosies, who played more than 700 games for the club between 1944 and 1963. Veendam’s top goal scorer was Marnix Kolder, who scored 104 goals in two spells for the club. Kolder also played for Veendam 1894 from 2016 to 2020, scoring 103 goals for the side. Ivan Tsvetkov and Michael de Leeuw were the only Veendam players to be crowned Eerste Divisie top goal scorer, in 2001–02 and 2009–10 respectively. In 1972, Veendam’s Eltje Edens became the first player in Dutch professional football to receive a yellow card, in a game against HVC.

Veendam’s largest ever victory was a 9–0 win against  in the 1960–61 KNVB Cup. The club’s largest win in league football was an 8–0 victory against Zwolsche Boys in the 1957–58 Tweede Divisie. The largest defeat was a 10–0 loss to FC Utrecht in the 2000–01 KNVB Cup. Veendam's highest home attendance was 13,500, for an 1979–80 Eerste Divisie match against FC Groningen on 2 March 1980.

Notes

References

 
Defunct football clubs in the Netherlands
Football clubs in Veendam
Association football clubs established in 1894
1894 establishments in the Netherlands
Association football clubs disestablished in 2013
2013 disestablishments in the Netherlands